Madame Sans-Gêne is a 1911 silent French film set in the French Revolution and during Napoleon's reign. It is based on the 1893 play of the same name. Gabrielle Réjane and Edmond Duquesne reprised their roles in the play; Réjane played the title character, a laundress who marries a man who becomes one of Napoleon's field marshals (based on the real-life Catherine Hübscher), while Duquesne played Napoleon. Conflicting sources state the director was André Calmettes or Henri Desfontaines.

According to Richard Abel, Madame Sans-Gêne is "still extant."

References

External links

French black-and-white films
French films based on plays
French silent short films
Depictions of Napoleon on film
French historical films
1910s historical films
Films based on works by Victorien Sardou
1910s French films